Pullimosina is a genus of flies in the family Sphaeroceridae, the lesser dung flies.

Subgenera and species
Pullimosina (Dahlimosina) 
Pullimosina bladesi 
Pullimosina dahli 
Pullimosina darwini 
Pullimosina hirsutiphallus 
Pullimosina karelica 
Pullimosina paramoesta 
Pullimosina yukonensis 
Pullimosina (Pullimosina) 
Pullimosina costata 
Pullimosina geminata 
Pullimosina heteroneura 
Pullimosina latipes 
Pullimosina longicornuta 
Pullimosina longicosta 
Pullimosina mcalpinei 
Pullimosina meijerei 
Pullimosina meruinaa 
Pullimosina moesta 
Pullimosina propecaeca 
Pullimosina pullula 
Pullimosina ryukyuensis 
Pullimosina umphreyi 
Pullimosina vockerothi 
Pullimosina woodi 
Pullimosina vernalis 
Pullimosina vulgesta 
Pullimosina zayensis

References

Sphaeroceridae
Sphaeroceroidea genera
Muscomorph flies of Europe
Diptera of Africa
Diptera of North America
Diptera of South America